Nicolás Arachichú de Armas (born 6 July 1986) is a Uruguayan cyclist riding for CC Cerro Largo.

Major results
2013
 1st  National Road Race Championships
 1st Stage 7a Rutas de America
2014
 1st Stage 1 Vuelta del Uruguay
2016
 1st  National Road Race Championships
 1st Stages 3a (TTT) and 4 Vuelta del Uruguay

References

1986 births
Living people
Uruguayan male cyclists